The 1980 San Diego State Aztecs football team represented San Diego State University during the 1980 NCAA Division I-A football season as a member of the Western Athletic Conference (WAC).

The team was led by head coach Claude Gilbert, in his eight and final year, and played home games at San Diego Stadium in San Diego, California. They finished with a record of four wins and eight losses (4–8, 4–4 WAC).

Schedule

Team players in the NFL
The following were selected in the 1981 NFL Draft.

The following finished their college career in 1980, were not drafted, but played in the NFL.

Team awards

Notes

References

San Diego State
San Diego State Aztecs football seasons
San Diego State Aztecs football